Propentofylline (HWA 285) is a xanthine derivative drug with purported neuroprotective effects.

Pharmacology
It is a phosphodiesterase inhibitor, and also acts as an adenosine reuptake inhibitor.

Uses
Propentofylline was studied as a possible treatment for Alzheimer's disease and multi-infarct dementia, and has been studied, to a lesser extent, as a possible adjunct in the treatment of ischemic stroke, due to its vasodilating properties.

Propentofylline is in use as a veterinary medicine in older dogs.

See also
Pentoxifylline

External links
Summary of research, including possible multipartite mechanisms

References

Xanthines
Ketones
PDE4 inhibitors
Adenosine reuptake inhibitors
Adenosine receptor antagonists